There is a significant population of American Muslims in the Dallas–Fort Worth metroplex. Dallas-Fort Worth is home to sixty-two Sunni mosques. According to AbdelRahman Murphy, a Chicago-born, Irving-based Islamic teacher and Muslim community leader, other U.S.-based Muslims now refer to Dallas as the "Medina of America".
Not only is Dallas Masjid Al Islam the oldest Muslim community in the DFW area, it established the first mosque in the city of Dallas and established the first Muslim school in the DFW area. As of 2021, many major Muslim organizations and charities have headquarters or operations in DFW, mostly located in Richardson, Texas such as: ICNA Dallas, 
Muslim American Society, Muslim Legal Fund of America, Helping Hands for Relief & Development, Sabrina Memorial Foundation, Islamic Relief USA, CAIR-Texas, and MA’RUF. There are also several institutions of research and higher education such as: Qalam Institute (Carrollton), ISRA Foundation (Plano), Bayyina Academy (Euless), and The Islamic Seminary of America (Richardson). -

Halal Restaurants In Dallas Fort-Worth: There are a plethora of options across the DFW area for halal food restaurants. Afrah in Richardson, Plano Texas King, Dimassi’s, various locations, Board Bites in Plano, Jimmy’s Burger and Grill in Plano, Crescent Moon in Plano, Minerva Indian Bistro in Plano, Olive Burger in Plano, Thai Noodle Wave, various locations.

History
Islam first came to Dallas through the Nation of Islam, whose members were sent by Elijah Muhammad during the 1950s, founding Temple #48 in Downtown Dallas. When Elijah Muhammad was succeeded by his sun Wallace Deen Muhammad in 1975, the Dallas Temple #48 was reorganized as The Dallas Masjid Al-Islam. Dallas Masjid al Islam was the first and oldest Muslim community in Dallas area. It started the first Muslim school in Dallas and the first Mosque in the city. Meanwhile, international Muslims established the Islamic Association of North Texas in 1969. In 1977, the African American Muslims and the International Immigrant Muslims had the first combined Eid al-Fitr on Baghdad St. in a backyard in Grand Prairie, TX. In 1980, IANT was joined by Imam Yusuf Ziya Kavakçı. Throughout the next few decades, more Mosques were built. IANT established the longest running free health clinics of the Muslim community, followed by the East Plano Islamic Center and Valley Ranch Islamic Center later on. Eventually, Nouman Ali Khan moved to Dallas, followed by Omar Suleiman. This led to an increase of Muslim immigration to Dallas from other parts of America. There is also a growing number of Hispanic Muslims in Dallas.

List of mosques

There are few more mosque that can be found on Muslim Directory

List of Islamic scholars and speakers

Controversies

Holy Land Foundation (HLF)

The Holy Land Foundation (HLF) was the largest Islamic charity in the United States. Headquartered in Richardson, Texas, and run by Palestinian-Americans, it was originally known as Occupied Land Fund. During the 1990s, American politicians, including Chuck Schumer and Eliot Spitzer, alongside the Israeli Government and "Misinformation Expert" Steve Emerson, lobbied the US Government to take action against the Holy Land Foundation. In 2004, a federal grand jury in Dallas, Texas charged HLF and five former officers and employees with providing material support to Hamas and related offenses. The prosecution's theory was that HLF distributed charity through local zakat (charity) committees located in the West Bank that paid stipends to the families of Palestinian suicide bombers and Hamas prisoners; that Hamas controlled those zakat committees; that by distributing charity through Hamas-controlled committees, HLF helped Hamas build a grassroots support amongst the Palestinian people; and that these charity front organizations served a dual purpose of laundering the money for all of Hamas's activities. Their trial has been considered by the Dallas Muslim Community as "unjust" and has been written to have "Capitalized on post-9/11 Islamophobic hysteria".

Critics faulted some of the evidence given during the trial. For example, over defense objection, the government called two anonymous witnesses: an Israeli Security Agency (ISA) employee who was known to the jurors and the defense as "Avi" and an Israeli Defense Forces officer who was known to the jurors and the defense as "Major Lior." The defense lawyers were not permitted to know the names of these witnesses. The government cited legal restrictions and safety concerns to protect Avi's identity, of which the motion for protective measures was granted his testimony was based on "much of the material that has previously been provided to the defense... as well as some of the documentation seized from the Holy Land Foundation's offices." However, the government was ordered to provide the defendants with all "tangible underlying facts and data, not previously produced, upon which the ISA agent relies in reaching his opinion." Civil rights attorney Emily Ratner wrote that the use of anonymous and hearsay evidence by the prosecutors was “constitutionally questionable” at best. Additionally, much of the evidence used to convict the Holy Land Foundation was "Secret Evidence" which the defense was unable to read or even know who made it.

The government did not allege that HLF paid directly for suicide bombings, but instead that the foundation supported terrorism by sending more than $12 million to charitable groups, known as zakat or charity committees, which provide social goods and services. The prosecution said the committees were controlled by Hamas, and contributed to terrorism by helping Hamas spread its ideology, recruit supporters, and provide a front for laundering money and soliciting donations. According to Marjorie Cohn, Professor Emerita of the Thomas Jefferson School of Law, the trial was a "grave miscarriage of justice" and "capitalized on post-9/11 Islamophobic hysteria" in order to convict the Holy Land 5. Pulitzer Prize journalist Chris Hedges describes it as "one of the most egregious cases of injustice committed to date against Muslim leaders in the United States.”

References

Dallas Fort Worth
Dallas–Fort Worth metroplex